For the 2008–09 season, Carlisle United F.C. competed in Football League One.

Results & fixtures

English League One

FA Cup

League Cup

Football League Trophy

References

Carlisle United F.C. seasons
Carlisle United